The Essential Rick Price is a greatest hits album by Australian APRA award winning singer songwriter Rick Price. The album was released in November 2010.
Price achieved media attention in Australia with "Heaven Knows" in 1992. The album was a big hit in Asia and Europe.

Track listing

Release history

References

External links

Rick Price albums
Compilation albums by Australian artists
2010 greatest hits albums
Sony Music Australia albums